The Kohima Stone Inscription or the Gambhir Singh's Stone is a Meitei language stone inscription, erected by Meitei King Raja Gambhir Singh of Manipur kingdom in Kohima, the capital of Nagaland. It was erected in 1833 AD as a mark of Manipuri conquest and supremacy over the Naga Hills in 1832 AD. It was inscribed in sanskritised Manipuri language (Meitei language) in Bengali script. Manipuri King Raja Gambhir Singh conquered the whole Naga Hills with his military power of Manipur Levy. It was after he had finally defeated the Angami Nagas of Kohima that the historic testimonial stone inscription was erected.

History 
Manipuri influence over the Naga ethnic groups declined during a period before and after the Burmese war of 1819-25. However, it was re-asserted during the time of Raja Gambhir Singh. He reduced many ethnic villages, including Kohima, at which he stood upon the stone and had his footprints sculpted on it as a token of conquest. Kohima and its surrounding villages were the boundaries of Manipur. The Nagas greatly respected this stone and cleaned it from time to time

Importance 
The stone is so much important that it is frequently mentioned in many land laws and orders announced by the British Government of Naga Hills. One famous example is the Order of W.J. Williamson, a British Political Agent of Naga Hills on 19 April 1880.

The stone inscription is notably mentioned in the "My Experiences in Manipur and the Naga hills" (1896) by Colonel Sir James Johnstone, the then Political Agent of Manipur, and the The Meitheis (1908) written by Thomas Callan Hodson, the then Political Agent of Manipur.

See also 
 Konthoujam Lairembi Stone Inscription

References 

Meitei inscriptions